St Lawrence Church is an eighteenth-century, neoclassical church in Ayot St Lawrence, Hertfordshire, England.  It is also known as New St Lawrence Church to distinguish it from the ruined Old St Lawrence Church.

History
The church was commissioned by Sir Lionel Lyde, a merchant who had a country estate at Ayot St Lawrence. According to Historic England, construction was financed with profits from the slave trade. He intended this to replace the 'Old Church' which he had partly demolished because the latter obstructed the view from his Ayot House, his mansion.

The architect was Nicholas Revett, the co-author of The Antiquities of Athens and Other Monuments of Greece, a multi-volume publication which appeared from 1762. Revett had visited Greece to study its architectural heritage. One of the sources of inspiration for the church may have been a temple on the island of Delos.

Architecture and conservation
The style of the church has been described as Palladian, although this is something of a misnomer as, in contrast to Revett, Palladio never visited Greece. Palladio was an expert on Roman architecture, and the Palladian style was derived only indirectly from Greek architecture. There is some debate as to how Revett's neoclassicism should be categorised. Greek Revival is arguably not the ideal term, and some scholars prefer "Grecian revival".

The front of the church with its portico and screens of columns is designed to be viewed from Ayot House, across a parkland setting.

Interior
The interior of the building has a Greek cross plan.
Because of the orientation of the building to face Ayot House, liturgical east and west do not coincide with geography. The chancel and altar are at the west end of the church.

Despite the eye-catching facade, the church's interior is relatively small, having a capacity of about 120, which reflects the population of the parish.

Conservation
The building has been Grade I listed since the 1960s.

Mausolea
On either side of the church is a mausoleum for Lionel Lyde and his wife Rachel.  Lyde is alleged to have said of this arrangement that ‘since the Church united us in life, she can make amends by separating us in death’.
The urns are raised on tall plinths and sheltered by aedicules.

References

External links
 Website

18th-century Church of England church buildings
Ayot
Grade I listed churches in Hertfordshire
Neoclassical architecture in Hertfordshire
Mausoleums in England
Buildings and structures in Ayot St Lawrence
Neoclassical church buildings in England